Mycosphaerella horii is a fungal plant pathogen.

See also
 List of Mycosphaerella species

References

horii
Fungal plant pathogens and diseases